Jackson Township is one of eleven townships in Howard County, Indiana, United States. As of the 2010 census, its population was 596 and it contained 233 housing units.

History
Jackson Township was organized in 1853. It was named for President Andrew Jackson.

Geography

Unincorporated towns
 Sycamore

Former Settlements
 West Sims (just west of Sims in Grant County)

Adjacent townships
 Jackson Township, Miami County (north)
 Richland Township, Grant County (northeast)
 Sims Township, Grant County (east)
 Green Township, Grant County (southeast)
 Union Township (south)
 Liberty Township (west)
 Harrison Township, Miami County (northwest)

Major highways

References
 
 United States Census Bureau cartographic boundary files

External links
 Indiana Township Association
 United Township Association of Indiana

Townships in Howard County, Indiana
Kokomo, Indiana metropolitan area
Townships in Indiana